The County of Newell is a municipal district in southern Alberta, Canada. Located in Census Division No. 2, its municipal office is located south of the City of Brooks.

History 
It was incorporated as the County of Newell No. 4 on January 1, 1953, through the amalgamation of the Municipal District of Newell No. 28 and part of the Municipal District of Bow Valley No. 40. Its name was changed to the County of Newell on September 9, 2011.

Geography

Communities and localities 
 
The following urban municipalities are surrounded by the County of Newell.
Cities
Brooks
Towns
Bassano
Villages
Duchess
Rosemary
Summer villages
none

The following hamlets are located within the County of Newell.
Hamlets
Bow City
Cassils
Gem
Lake Newell Resort
Patricia
Rainier
Rolling Hills
Scandia
Tilley

The following localities are located within the County of Newell.
Localities 
Bantry
Campbell
Control
Countess
Denhart
Fieldholme
Granta
Hants
Kinbrook
Kininvie
Kitsim
Lathom
Mallow
Matzhiwin
Millicent
Princess
Redelback
Southesk
Steveville
Verger

Demographics 

The population of the County of Newell according to its 2020 municipal census is 7,502.

In the 2016 Census of Population conducted by Statistics Canada, the County of Newell had a population of 7,524 living in 2,412 of its 2,627 total private dwellings, a  change from its 2011 population of 7,138.

See also 
List of communities in Alberta
List of municipal districts in Alberta

References

External links 

 
Newell